This is a list of holidays in Saint Lucia.

 1-2 January: New Year's Day
 22 February: Independence Day, from the UK, 1979
 (variable): Good Friday
 (variable): Easter Monday
 1 May: Labour Day
 (variable): Whit Monday
 (variable): Corpus Christi
 (variable): Carnival Monday
 1 August: Emancipation Day, commemorates the liberation of slaves in 1834.
 First Monday in October: Thanksgiving
 13 December: National Day, Feast of Saint Lucy, patron saint of the island.
 25 December: Christmas Day
 26 December: Boxing Day

References 

 
Saint Lucia